1515 Tower (originally The Arkona) was a former residential high-rise in West Palm Beach, Florida. Completed in 1974, it was the second tallest building in West Palm Beach with 30 stories and rising .
1515 Tower was heavily damaged during Hurricane Frances and Hurricane Jeanne in 2004 and was subsequently vacated. The facade was heavily damaged as a result of the storms, and on August 1, 2006, the city issued a demolition order. The building was demolished by use of explosives, colloquially called implosion, on Sunday, February 14, 2010. 1515 Tower was the third tallest building in the United States to be imploded. There have been several proposals for a new building at the site at 1515 South Flagler Drive.

References

External links
Videos
1515 Tower To Come Down This Weekend
Last Downtown Building Implosion Happened In 1995
Implosion of 1515 Condo Tower, West Palm Beach

1974 establishments in Florida
2010 disestablishments in Florida
Buildings and structures in West Palm Beach, Florida
Buildings and structures demolished by controlled implosion
Demolished buildings and structures in Florida
Residential buildings completed in 1974
Buildings and structures demolished in 2010
Former skyscrapers
Residential skyscrapers in Florida